Japanese banana may refer to one of the following banana plants:

 Musa basjoo, native to southern China
 Musa insularimontana, native to Taiwan

See also
 the song "Japanese Banana", from the Alvin and the Chipmunks album Around the World with The Chipmunks